is a mahjong arcade game developed by Sega AM2 and released by Sega. The first version for arcades was released in July 2002 for the Sega NAOMI 2 arcade system. It featured online features with ranking, customization and recording your play history, using the experience that AM2 had developed from Virtua Fighter 4 and VF.NET. It received numerous updates and sequels since then.

Sega Network Taisen Mahjong MJ2, the first sequel, switched arcade boards to the Sega Chihiro, and brought in nationwide online play. Sega Network Taisen Mahjong MJ3 was released and expanded the ruleset. Sega Network Taisen Mahjong MJ4 switched arcade boards to the Sega Lindbergh, and a training mode was added. Sega Network Taisen Mahjong MJ5 was on the Sega RingEdge and had multi-touch touchscreens. It was updated as Sega Network Taisen Mahjong MJ5R Evolution.

Eleven years later after launch of the first game, Sega Network Taisen Mahjong MJ was ported outside of the arcade with a version on PC and mobile. A full English localization of the mobile version was also released, however was shut down. English and Traditional Chinese languages was available in the Japanese version. It was also available on the free to play companion app of Yakuza 0 on PlayStation Vita.

A new version for arcades was also released, called Sega Network Taisen Mahjong MJ Arcade.

External Links 

 Official website (English)
 Official website

References 

 Video games developed in Japan
Sega arcade games
2002 video games
2003 video games
2005 video games
2008 video games
2011 video games
2013 video games
2017 video games
Mahjong video games
Sega-AM2 games
Multiplayer and single-player video games
Sega Games franchises
Windows games
IOS games
Android (operating system) games